Field Island is a Baffin Island offshore island located in the Arctic Archipelago in the territory of Nunavut. The island lies in Frobisher Bay, west of Waddell Bay, and southeast of Opera Glass Cape on the Hall Peninsula. Islands in the immediate vicinity include: Bruce Island to the northwest, Fletcher Island to the west, and Chase Island to the south.

References 

Uninhabited islands of Qikiqtaaluk Region
Islands of Frobisher Bay